Julio Jiménez may refer to: Julio Jimenez (writer), Colombian writer
 Julio Jiménez (cyclist) (1934–2022), Spanish cyclist
 Julio Jiménez (politician) (1964–2020), Bolivian politician
 Julio Jiménez Rueda (1896–1960), Mexican lawyer, writer, playwright and diplomat
 Julio César Jiménez (born 1954), Uruguayan footballer